This is a list of episodes for The Tonight Show with Jay Leno that aired in 2011.

2011

January

February

March

April

May

June

July

August

September

October

November

December

Notes

References

External links
 
 Lineups at Interbridge 
 

Episodes
Tonight Show with Jay Leno
Tonight Show with Jay Leno